Madrigal is a European musical form of the 16th and 17th centuries.

Madrigal may also refer to:

Literature

Works
 Madrigal (poetry), a type of poem
 "Madrigal", a poem by Federico García Lorca
 "Madrigal", a spy novel by John Gardner

Characters
 Madrigal, a main character in the Daughter of Smoke and Bone trilogy by Laini Taylor
 Anna Madrigal, fictional character from Armistead Maupin's novel series Tales of the City
 Miss Madrigal, a character in the play The Chalk Garden by Enid Bagnold
 Madrigal Raith, aka Darby Crane, a character in the novel Proven Guilty by Jim Butcher
 Madeline Madrigal, aka Ma-Ma, a character in the 2012 movie Dredd
 Madrigal, a mysterious family branch in the novel series: The 39 Clues
 The Madrigal family, a group of characters from the 2021 Disney animated film Encanto
 Mirabel Madrigal, a fictional character and protagonist of Encanto
 Bruno Madrigal, a fictional character in Encanto, uncle of the protagonist
 Isabela Madrigal, a fictional character in Encanto, sister of the protagonist

Music

Forms
 Madrigal comedy, entertainment music of late 16th century Italy, featuring a cappella madrigals
 Madrigal dinner, a form of dinner theater incorporating comedy, madrigals, and a feast
 Madrigal (Trecento), an Italian musical form of the fourteenth and early fifteenth centuries

Artists
 Madrigal (ensemble) an early music group formed in 1965 by the Russian composer and harpsichord player Andrey Volkonsky
 Madrigal (band), a Canadian rock band of the early 1970s

Classical compositions
"Madrigal" (Fauré), an 1883 song by Gabriel Fauré
Madrigal, a composition for organ by Edwin Lemare (1865-1934) 
Madrigal, a piano composition by Lao Silesu (1883-1953)
Madrigal, a composition for trombones by Georges Delerue (1925-1992)
Madrigal, a composition for violin and piano by Ma Sicong
Madrigal, a song by Cécile Chaminade (1857-1944)

Albums
 Madrigals (aka Love Songs for Madrigals and Madriguys), a 1974 recording by Swingle II
 , a 2001 album by Japanese singer Chara

Songs
 "Madrigal", a song sung by Andy Williams from The Academy Award-Winning "Call Me Irresponsible" and Other Hit Songs from the Movies 1964
 "Madrigal", a song by American singer Neil Diamond, from the album Tap Root Manuscript 1970
 "Madrigal", a song by the Canadian rock band Rush, from the album A Farewell to Kings 1977
 "Madrigal", a song by British progressive rock band Yes, from the album Tormato 1978
 "Madrigal", a song by Swedish progressive metal band Opeth, from the album My Arms, Your Hearse 1998
 "Madrigal", a song by Puerto Rican singer and songwriter Danny Rivera
 "Madrigal", a song by Japanese band Malice Mizer, from the album Voyage Sans Retour 1996
 "Madrigal", a song by Australian band Taxiride, from the album Garage Mahal 2002

Television
 "Madrigal" (Breaking Bad), episode 5.02 of Breaking Bad
 Madrigal Electromotive, a fictitious multinational conglomerate in Breaking Bad and Better Call Saul

People

Madrigal is also used as a Spanish surname that refers to:
 Al Madrigal (born 1971), American stand-up comedian and actor of Mexican descent
 Alexander Madrigal (born 1972), Costa Rican-Mexican footballer
 Alexis Madrigal, an American journalist
 Diego Madrigal (born 1989), Costa Rican football striker
 Jamby Madrigal (born 1958), Filipina politician and senator
 Junior Félix Madrigal (born 1982), Mexican football goalkeeper
 Liliana Madrigal (born 1957), Costa Rican conservationist 
 Michelle Madrigal (born 1986), Filipina actress
 Nick Madrigal (born 1997), American baseball player 
 Roger Madrigal (born 1972), Costa Rican slalom canoer
 Warner Madrigal (born 1984), Major League Baseball relief pitcher

Places
 Madrigal de las Altas Torres, a municipality in Ávila, Castile and León, Spain
 Madrigal del Monte, a municipality in Burgos, Castile and León, Spain
 Estadio El Madrigal, a stadium in Villarreal, Spain

Other uses
Madrigal Audio Laboratories, an American company (closed in 2002)

Spanish-language surnames